Ricardo J. ("Ricky") Busquets Healy (born October 3, 1974 in Ponce, Puerto Rico) is a former freestyle swimmer from Puerto Rico.

He is now an orthodontist who works in the Bay Area of California.

References
 Profile

1974 births
Living people
Puerto Rican male freestyle swimmers
Puerto Rican male swimmers
Puerto Rican people of Catalan descent
Puerto Rican people of Irish descent
Swimmers at the 1991 Pan American Games
Swimmers at the 1992 Summer Olympics
Swimmers at the 1995 Pan American Games
Swimmers at the 1996 Summer Olympics
Swimmers at the 1999 Pan American Games
Swimmers at the 2000 Summer Olympics
Swimmers at the 2003 Pan American Games
Swimmers at the 2004 Summer Olympics
Olympic swimmers of Puerto Rico
University of Tennessee alumni
Tennessee Volunteers men's swimmers
World Aquatics Championships medalists in swimming
Medalists at the FINA World Swimming Championships (25 m)
Sportspeople from Ponce, Puerto Rico
Pan American Games silver medalists for Puerto Rico
Pan American Games bronze medalists for Puerto Rico
Pan American Games medalists in swimming
Goodwill Games medalists in swimming
Central American and Caribbean Games gold medalists for Puerto Rico
Competitors at the 1990 Central American and Caribbean Games
Competitors at the 1998 Central American and Caribbean Games
Competitors at the 2002 Central American and Caribbean Games
Central American and Caribbean Games medalists in swimming
Competitors at the 1998 Goodwill Games
Medalists at the 1991 Pan American Games